The Grammy Award for Best Classical Performance - Operatic or Choral was awarded in 1959. The equivalent award, Best Classical Performance - Opera Cast or Choral was awarded in 1960.  Since 1962 the award has been divided into separate awards for opera and choral performances. See Grammy Award for Best Opera Recording and Grammy Award for Best Choral Performance.

Years reflect the year in which the Grammy Awards were presented, for works released in the previous year.

Recipients

References 

Grammy Awards for classical music